The SZD-8 Jaskółka was a single-seat glider aircraft that was designed and built in Poland at Szybowcowy Zakład Doświadczalny (Glider Experimental Works) in Bielsko-Biała from 1951.

Development
With prototypes rolled out in September and December 1951, the  SZD-8 Jaskółka (Swallow) was a high-performance glider for its day, introducing several innovations to glider design such as a sliding moulded Plexiglas canopy, recessed handle in the rear fuselage for ground handling and a semi-retractable mainwheel. The all-wood wings were covered with plywood and fabric incorporating Fowler flaps on the trailing edges, which could be lowered to 12° or 25°, and Schemp-Hirth style airbrakes aft of the mainspars. Main designer was Tadeusz Kostia. The first prototype was flown on 21 September 1951 (test pilot Adam Zientek), but it revealed faults. After reconstruction, with longer fuselage and enlarged rudder (designated SZD-8-2) it appeared successful and was ordered into production, becoming the most popular competition glider in Poland from 1953 to 1957. Many of the 135 production aircraft were exported, garnering at least fifteen world records from May 1954 to May 1960. Licensed production was also carried out in the DDR (Deutsche Demokratische Republik - German Democratic Republic) and the PRC (People's Republic of China). Several variants were produced which introduced various improvements and modifications.

Variants
SZD-8two prototypes, first flown 21 September 1951
SZD 8-2first prototype after reconstruction, first flown 16 March 1952 
SZD-8bis Jaskółkainitial production variant (first flown 24 December 1952; 30 built)
SZD-8bisE Jaskółka Eimproved variant of 1954 (30 built)
SZD-8bisW Jaskółka Wvariant with water ballast (1 built, later converted to SZD-8bisZ)
SZD-8bisZ Jaskółka Zone prototype
SZD-8bisO Jaskółka Oexport variant
SZD 8terZ Jaskółka Zvariant with water ballast, introduced in May 1958
SZD 8terZO Jaskółka ZOvariant without water ballast, introduced in 1958
Shenyang X-10 Qian Jin a licensed version of the SZD-8/14 Jaskolka, with modifications, built in the People's Republic of China at the Shenyang aviation factory.

Specifications (SZD-8bis Jaskółka Z)

See also

Notes

External links

http://www.piotrp.de/SZYBOWCE/pszd8.htm

SZD-08
SZD aircraft
Aircraft first flown in 1951